Teobaldo Visconti (1230-1276)  (also known as Tibaldo Viconti) was born in Invorio. He was Ottone Visconti's nephew and Matteo I Visconti's father.

He also had a younger son Uberto from which the Visconti di Modrone descend from.

He was beheaded by Napo Torriani forces in 1276 in Gallarate.

1276 deaths
1230 births
Deaths by decapitation
Teobaldo